The Frederick House, at 238 Vermont St. in Covington, Louisiana, is a one-and-half-story raised house built around 1890.  It was listed on the National Register of Historic Places in 1982.

It was built by Emile "Boss" Frederick (d. 1945), who was a Covington politician while living in the house.

It has Queen Anne and Stick/Eastlake ornamentation.

References

Stick-Eastlake architecture in the United States

Queen Anne architecture in Louisiana
National Register of Historic Places in St. Tammany Parish, Louisiana
Houses completed in 1890